Euphaedra hebes, the hebes pink forester, is a butterfly in the family Nymphalidae. It is found in north-eastern Guinea, Liberia, Ivory Coast, Ghana, Nigeria, Cameroon and Gabon. The habitat consists of wetter forests.

References

Butterflies described in 1980
hebes